Lucía Jiménez Arranz (born 21 November 1978) is a Spanish actress.

She started with a David Trueba movie, La Buena Vida, and she became very popular thanks to the TV series Al salir de clase.

Filmography

Cinema

Television

References

External links 
 

1978 births
Living people
Spanish film actresses
People from Segovia
Spanish television actresses